The Bolivia women's national under-16 and under-17 basketball team is a national basketball team of Bolivia, administered by the Federación Boliviana de Básquetbol (FBB).

It represents the country in international under-16 and under-17 (under age 16 and under age 17) women's basketball competitions.

It lastly appeared at the 2017 South American U17 Championship for Women.

See also
Bolivia women's national basketball team
Bolivia women's national under-19 basketball team
Bolivia men's national under-17 basketball team

References

External links
Bolivia Basketball Records at FIBA Archive

U-17
Women's national under-17 basketball teams